Raheem Ghamzada (Pashto: رحيم غمزده), was a prominent Pashto-language poet and singer in the 70's till his death in 2011 due to Cancer. Rahim Ghamzada was the first singer who composed Pashto folk music in both eastern and western tunes.

Early life 
Ghamzada was born in Afghanistan, Khogyani (Pashto: خوږياڼي ولسوالۍ, Persian: ولسوالی خوگیانی) is a district in the south of Nangarhar Province, Afghanistan.

Career 
Ghamzada had worked for 60 years in music branch of Radio Television Afghanistan (RTA). Rahim Ghamzada turned to music at the age of Fourteen. He shone brightly in the late 1950s and recorded nearly two hundred songs on the Afghan National Radio and Television.

He combined Indian and Western compositions with Pashto songs, which made his songs more popular and successful.
Rahim Ghamzada composed all his songs. One of the secrets of his artistic success was the selection of good poems.

He Composed and sung to the poems of Ghani Khan, Rehman Baba and other powerful poets decades ago. Ghamzada also won many awards and accolades for his art.

Influence 
He belonged to the Khogyani tribe of the ethnic Pashtuns. His work is considered a fusion between classic and modern poetry. He wrote classical poetry, blended it with recent innovations, and introduced new ideas in Pashto.

Personal life 
Rahim Ghamzada said in an interview decades ago that he had four sons and two daughters.
These figures may have changed given the age of the interview and the information.

The lawyer 
Rahim Ghamzada, as mentioned, was also the advocate of his people.
He lived near the Angorbagh area of Jalalabad's second district.
Ghamzada is still famous for his street where most of his family lives.

The poet 
Rahim Ghamzada was also a poet and recited many of his poems with music.
Ghamzada's poetry was also remarkable and can be reckoned with at the level of folk poetry.
His collection of poems, titled Pashto (زما ښکلی جانانه), was compiled and published a few years ago by Lal Pacha Azmoon, a professor at Kabul University.

References

External links
 Rahim Ghamzada  at 
 Rahim Ghamzada  at 

Pashtun people
Recipients of the Pride of Performance
1939 births
2011 deaths